Antoine-Augustin Parmentier (12 August 1737 – 13 December 1813) was a French pharmacist and agronomist, best remembered as a vocal promoter of the potato as a food source for humans in France and throughout Europe.  His many other contributions to nutrition and health included establishing the first mandatory smallpox vaccination campaign (under Napoleon beginning in 1805, when he was Inspector-General of the Health Service) and pioneering the extraction of sugar from sugar beets. Parmentier also founded a school of breadmaking and studied methods of conserving food, including refrigeration.

Life and career
While serving as an army pharmacist for France in the Seven Years' War, he was captured by the Prussians, and in prison in Prussia was faced with eating potatoes, known to the French only as hog feed. The potato had been introduced from South America to Europe by the Spaniards at the beginning of the 16th century. It was introduced to the rest of Europe by 1640 but (outside Spain and Ireland) was usually used only for animal feed. King Frederick II of Prussia had required peasants to cultivate the plants under severe penalties and had provided them with cuttings. In 1748 France had actually forbidden the cultivation of the potato (on the grounds that it was thought to cause leprosy among other things), and this law remained on the books in Parmentier's time, until 1772.

From his return to Paris in 1763 he pursued his pioneering studies in nutritional chemistry. His prison experience came to mind in 1772 when he proposed (in a contest sponsored by the Academy of Besançon) use of the potato as a source of nourishment for dysenteric patients. He won the prize on behalf of the potato in 1773.

Due largely to Parmentier's efforts, the Paris Faculty of Medicine declared potatoes edible in 1772.  Still, resistance continued, and Parmentier was prevented from using his test garden at the Invalides hospital, where he was pharmacist, by the religious community that owned the land, whose complaints resulted in the suppression of Parmentier's post at the Invalides.

In 1779, Parmentier was appointed to teach at the Free School of Bakery to help stabilize Paris' food supply by making bread in a more cost-efficient fashion. In that same year, he published Manière de faire le pain de pommes de terre, sans mélange de farine, in which he described how one can make potato bread that still has all the characteristics of wheat bread.

In 1800, Napoléon Bonaparte appointed him the first army pharmacist. He succeeded Pierre Bayen: he continued his fight to place pharmacy on the same level as medicine and surgery.

Potato publicity stunts
Parmentier then began a series of publicity stunts for which he remains notable today, hosting dinners at which potato dishes featured prominently and guests included Benjamin Franklin and Antoine Lavoisier. He gave bouquets of potato blossoms to the king and queen, and surrounded his potato patch at Sablons with armed guards during the day to suggest valuable goods, withdrawing them at night so people could steal the potatoes (the same story exists in Germany about Frederick the Great). These 54 arpents of impoverished ground near Neuilly, west of Paris, had been allotted him by order of Louis XVI in 1787.

Acceptance of the potato
In 1771, Parmentier won an essay contest in which all the judges voted the potato as the best substitute for ordinary flour. This was before a time when France needed a replacement for wheat, so Parmentier continued to face criticism and lack of acknowledgment for his work. 
The first step in the acceptance of the potato in French society was a year of bad harvests, 1785, when the scorned potatoes staved off famine in the north of France. In 1789, Parmentier published 
Treatise on the Culture and Use of the Potato, Sweet Potato, and Jerusalem Artichoke 
(Traité sur la culture et les usages des Pommes de terre, de la Patate, et du Topinambour), "printed by order of the king", giving royal backing to potato eating, albeit on the eve of the French Revolution, leaving it up to the Republicans to accept it. In 1794, Madame Mérigot published La Cuisinière Républicaine (The [Female] Republican Cook), the first potato cookbook,  promoting potatoes as food for the common people.

 
Parmentier's agronomic interests covered a wide range of opportunities to ameliorate the human lot through technical improvements; he published his observations touching on bread-baking, cheese-making, grain storage, the use of cornmeal (maize) and chestnut flour, mushroom culture, mineral waters, wine-making, improved sea biscuits, and a host of other topics of interest to the Physiocrats.

Dishes named after Parmentier
Starting in the 1870s, many dishes including potatoes were named in honor of Parmentier: potage, velouté, or crème Parmentier, a potato and leek soup; hachis Parmentier, a cottage or shepherd's pie; brandade de morue parmentier, salt cod mashed with olive oil and potatoes; pommes or garniture Parmentier, cubed potatoes fried in butter; purée Parmentier, mashed potatoes; salade Parmentier, potato salad.

Death and legacy
Parmentier died on 13 December 1813, aged 76. He is buried in Père Lachaise Cemetery in Paris, in a plot ringed by potato plants, and his name is given to a long avenue in the 10th and 11th arrondissements (and a station on line 3 of the Paris Métro). At Montdidier, his bronze statue surveys Place Parmentier from its high socle, while below, in full marble relief, seed potatoes are distributed to a grateful peasant. Another monumental statue of Parmentier, by French sculptor Adrien Étienne Gaudez, is erected in the square of the town hall of Neuilly-sur-Seine.

References

External links

L'Histoire en-ligne: Antoine-Augustin Parmentier 
L'Encyclopédie de l'Agora: Antoine-Augustin_Parmentier 
Catholic Encyclopedia: "Antoine-Augustin Parmentier"
Illustrated virtual exhibition

1737 births
1813 deaths
People from Montdidier, Somme
French pharmacists
French agronomists
Members of the French Academy of Sciences
Lycée Louis-le-Grand alumni
Burials at Père Lachaise Cemetery
18th-century agronomists
19th-century agronomists
Recipients of the Legion of Honour
History of the potato